Choeromorpha subviolacea is a species of beetle in the family Cerambycidae. It was described by Heller in 1923. It is known from Philippines.

References

Choeromorpha
Beetles described in 1923